Qué pena tu vida is a 2016 Mexican romantic comedy film directed by Luis Eduardo Reyes. The film is a Mexican adaptation of the 2010 Chilean film of the same name directed by Nicolás López. It stas José María de Tavira, Aislinn Derbez, and Ilse Salas. The film had a budget between 20 million and 25 million pesos, and it premiered on 2 December 2016 in Mexico.

Plot 
Javier (José María de Tavira) is a young designer with a promising future, but there is one detail: he has just finished his relationship with his girlfriend. Blinded by spite, he will lead his life to chaos and begin a path of bad decisions that lead him to the most absurd and fun situations, all this while trying to recover Sofía (Ilse Salas) and if it is not possible, then forget her. With the help of Andrea (Aislinn Derbez), her best friend, she will try to find herself, but not before meeting the strangest and craziest characters in the city.

Cast 
 José María de Tavira as Javier
 Aislinn Derbez as Andrea
 Ilse Salas as Sofía
 Álvaro Guerrero as Comisario Rafael Pérez
 Fabiola Campomanes as Lorena
 Rosa María Bianchi as Patricia
 Leonardo de Lozanne as Paul Izquierdo
 Fernanda Castillo as Úrsula
 Marcus Ornellas as Tigre
 Arturo Barba as Lorena's ex-boyfriend
 Alejandro Calva as Car seller

References

External links 
 

Mexican romantic comedy films
2016 romantic comedy films
2010s Mexican films